Justice Paine may refer to:

Bayard H. Paine (1872–1955), associate justice of the Nebraska Supreme Court
Byron Paine (1827–1871), associate justice of the Wisconsin Supreme Court
Elijah Paine (1757–1842), associate justice of the Vermont Supreme Court
Robert Treat Paine (1731–1814), associate justice of the Massachusetts Supreme Judicial Court

See also
Justice Pain (1978–2020), American professional wrestler
Elisha Payne (1731–1807), chief justice of the Supreme Court of Vermont
Judge Payne (disambiguation)